Billbergia eloiseae is a species of flowering plant in the genus Billbergia. It is endemic to Colombia.

Cultivars
 Billbergia 'Selby'

References

eloiseae
Endemic flora of Colombia
Plants described in 1983